Caldron Linn or Cauldron Linn can refer to the following waterfalls

Cauldron Linn (River Devon), Scotland
Caldron Linn, on Annet Burn, tributary of River Teith (see Waterfalls of Scotland)
Caldron Linn (Murtaugh, Idaho), USA